The 2016–17 Minnesota Golden Gophers men's basketball team represented the University of Minnesota in the 2016–17 NCAA Division I men's basketball season. The Gophers, led by fourth-year head coach Richard Pitino, were members of the Big Ten Conference and played their home games at Williams Arena in Minneapolis, Minnesota. They finished the season 24–10, 11–7 in Big Ten play to finish in fourth place. In the Big Ten tournament, they beat Michigan State in the quarterfinals before losing to Michigan in the semifinals. They received an at-large bid to the NCAA tournament as a No. 5 seed. The bid marked their first trip to the Tournament since 2013. In the First Round, they lost to No. 12-seeded Middle Tennessee.

Head coach Richard Pitino was named Big Ten Coach of the Year. Reggie Lynch was named defensive player of the year. Nate Mason was named to the All-Big Ten First Team.

Previous season
The Golden Gophers finished the 2015–16 season with a record of 8–23, 2–16 in Big Ten play to finish in 13th place in conference. They lost in the first round of the Big Ten tournament to Illinois.

The season was marred by the suspensions of three players, Kevin Dorsey, Nate Mason and Dupree McBrayer, on March 1, 2016 for allegedly posting a sex video online. The players were suspended for the rest of the season.

Offseason 
In May, 2016, Illinois State transfer, Reggie Lynch, was arrested by University police on suspicion of rape. In August, it was determined that charges would not be filed against Lynch. Lynch was reinstated to the team in September.

Departures

Incoming transfers

2016 recruiting class

2017 recruiting class

2018 recruiting class

Roster

Schedule and results

|-
! colspan=9 style=|Exhibition

|-
! colspan="9" style=|Non-conference regular season

|-
! colspan="9" style=|Big Ten regular season

|-
! colspan="9" style=|Big Ten tournament

|-
! colspan="9" style=|NCAA tournament

Rankings

*AP does not release post-NCAA tournament rankings

References

2016-17 team
2016–17 Big Ten Conference men's basketball season
2016 in sports in Minnesota
2017 in sports in Minnesota
Minnesota